David Wagner (born March 4, 1974) is an American wheelchair tennis player. Paralyzed from the mid-chest down and with thirty percent function in his hands, he competes in the quad division. He plays by taping the tennis racket to his hand. He is currently ranked number three in the world in singles and number two in doubles.

Early life
Wagner was born in Fullerton, California, and grew up in Walla Walla, Washington. He played basketball in high school and tennis in college. He became a quadriplegic at age 21 while visiting a friend in Redondo Beach, California, during summer break. He and his friends were playing frisbee on the beach and Wagner began chasing after the frisbee through shallow water. He attempted to jump over a wave, but the wave caught his feet, spun him around, and he landed head-first in the sand, leaving him paralyzed. He took a year off of college and began practicing table tennis as part of his rehabilitation. He won a national competition in that sport three years in a row, from 1997 to 1999.

Tennis career

In 1999, at age 25, he attended a wheelchair tennis training camp set up by Rick Draney, then the top-ranked quadriplegic tennis player in the world. Wagner immediately loved the sport and by 2002 was the number one ranked U.S. quadriplegic player.

In 2002, Wagner reached number one in the ITF world rankings in quad doubles, and in 2003, he reached number one in the quad singles world rankings as well. The 2004 Summer Paralympics were the first Paralympic Games to include the quad division. Wagner won the gold medal in Quad Doubles with partner Nick Taylor and the silver medal in singles.

In 2007, he participated in the first Quad competition held at the U.S. Open, winning doubles with Taylor and taking second place in singles behind Peter Norfolk. Wagner had urged the United States Tennis Association to include a quadriplegic division at the event; the U.S. Open was the first of the Grand Slam tournaments to do so. The Australian Open followed suit the next year, with Wagner finishing runner-up in singles, and winning doubles with Taylor. The US Open and the Australian Open were the only Grand Slams to offer a Quad wheelchair tennis draw, until 2019. The first Quad Wheelchair Doubles exhibition event was held at Wimbledon in 2018. Wagner won the event, partnering Andy Lapthorne. Later that year, Wimbledon announced that they would offer a singles and doubles quad draw . Roland Garros followed with a similar announcement a few months later. Wagner, partnering Alcott, won the inaugural Roland Garros Quad Doubles draw.

At the 2008 Beijing Paralympics, Wagner and Taylor won gold in doubles and competed against each other in the bronze medal match of the singles event, with Wagner taking the match and the medal. At the 2012 London Paralympics, Wagner and Taylor won one more gold medal in doubles, defeating the British team of Andy Lapthorne and Peter Norfolk in the final. Wagner also won a silver medal in singles. At the final, he played against Israel's Noam Gershony. At the 2016 Summer Paralympics, Wagner clinched two more medals, a Silver in Quad Doubles and a Bronze in Quad Singles.

According to ITF world rankings, Wagner had been consistently ranked in the top three of the quad division, in both singles and doubles, from 2002 until 2020. He has finished as Year-End Number 1 a total of eight times in singles, as well as fourteen times in doubles, . Wagner had been crowned doubles champion at every U.S. Open Quad Doubles draw, since the Grand Slam started offering a Quad Draw, in 2007, until 2019, when Wagner with partner Bryan Barten lost to Alcott and Lapthorne. He has also been crowned doubles champion in all editions of the French Open Quad Doubles draw so far, playing with three different partners.

Besides competing, Wagner is often invited to teach in wheelchair camps and clinics in the United States, where he encourages both kids and adults to become involved with the sport.

Personal
Wagner graduated with an elementary education degree in 2000. In 2001, when he had to choose between teaching and playing tennis, he decided to become a full time wheelchair tennis player. From 2006 until 2014 he lived in Hillsboro, Oregon, and then moved to Chula Vista, California. He trains at the Chula Vista Elite Athlete Training Center, (formerly Chula Vista Olympic Training Center) where he is the only tennis player in residence.

Tennis career statistics

Grand Slam performance timelines

Current through the 2022 US Open.

Quad singles

Quad doubles

References

External links
 David Wagner at the US Open
 
 
 
  

1974 births
Living people
American male tennis players
Wheelchair tennis players
Australian Open (tennis) champions
Wimbledon champions
US Open (tennis) champions
Paralympic wheelchair tennis players of the United States
Paralympic gold medalists for the United States
Paralympic silver medalists for the United States
Paralympic bronze medalists for the United States
Paralympic medalists in wheelchair tennis
Medalists at the 2004 Summer Paralympics
Medalists at the 2008 Summer Paralympics
Medalists at the 2012 Summer Paralympics
Medalists at the 2016 Summer Paralympics
Wheelchair tennis players at the 2004 Summer Paralympics
Wheelchair tennis players at the 2008 Summer Paralympics
Wheelchair tennis players at the 2012 Summer Paralympics
Wheelchair tennis players at the 2016 Summer Paralympics
People with tetraplegia
Sportspeople from Walla Walla, Washington
Sportspeople from Hillsboro, Oregon
Tennis people from Washington (state)
Walla Walla University alumni
DeVry University alumni
ITF number 1 ranked wheelchair tennis players
ITF World Champions